Boss Up may refer to:

"Boss Up", song by Criminalz and Spice 1 from Criminal Activity 2001
"Boss Up", a song by Tyga, 2017
Boss Up, a mixtape by Iamsu!, 2017